Ruth Abeles-Peled (רות אבלס; born August 7, 1942) is an Israeli former Olympic gymnast.

She was born in Haifa, Israel, and is Jewish.

Gymnastics career
She competed for Israel at the 1960 Summer Olympics in Rome, Italy, in gymnastics at the age of 18. In the Women's Individual All-Around, she came in 93rd out of 124 gymnasts, in the Women's Floor Exercise she came in 79th, in the Women's Horse Vault she came in 100th, in the Women's Uneven Bars she came in tied for 55th, and in the Women's Balance Beam she came in tied for 108th.

At the 1962 World Artistic Gymnastics Championships, she helped the Israeli team gain 15th place as she finished in 67th place in the individual all-around.

References

External links
 

Gymnasts at the 1960 Summer Olympics
Israeli female artistic gymnasts
Living people
1942 births
Olympic gymnasts of Israel
Jewish gymnasts
Sportspeople from Haifa